Proctor is a large crater in the Noachis quadrangle of Mars.  It measures  in diameter and was named after Richard A. Proctor, a British astronomer (1837–1888).

Dune fields 
The crater contains a 35 x 65 km dark dune field. It was one of the first sand dune fields ever recognized on Mars based on Mariner 9 images. The crater's dunes are being monitored by HiRISE to identify changes over time.

See also 
 List of craters on Mars: O-Z

References

External links

 

Noachis quadrangle
Impact craters on Mars